William Cullen Bryant (May 20, 1951 – October 13, 2009) was a professional American football player who spent thirteen seasons in the National Football League (NFL) as a running back and return specialist for the Los Angeles Rams and Seattle Seahawks. He played college football at Colorado.

Early life
Bryant was born in Fort Sill, Oklahoma. His father, who was a fan of poetry, named him after the poet William Cullen Bryant. He graduated as part of the first class to spend all three years at William (Billy) Mitchell High School in Colorado Springs, Colorado in 1969.

A three-year letterman (1970–1972) who played for Eddie Crowder at the University of Colorado, Bryant, who wore uniform number 16, starred at defensive back. During his junior and senior years, the Buffaloes were nationally ranked in the Associated Press (AP) Poll, finishing 3rd and 16th in 1971 and 1972 respectively. He played in the Senior Bowl and College All-Star Game in 1973.

Professional career
He was selected by the Rams in the second round (31st overall) of the 1973 NFL Draft. He was the primary return specialist in his first four years with the team, working exclusively on kickoffs as a rookie. He scored his first NFL touchdown on September 30, 1973 when he returned a first-quarter kickoff 93 yards in a 40–20 victory over the 49ers in San Francisco.

Bryant's one-yard touchdown run in the first quarter gave the Rams an early 7–3 lead in its 31–19 loss to the Pittsburgh Steelers in Super Bowl XIV. He ended the game with 6 carries for 30 yards.

Rozelle Rule challenge
At the behest of Rams owner Carroll Rosenbloom, Bryant went to court in 1975 to challenge his transfer to the Detroit Lions under the Pete Rozelle Rule. This came after Rozelle ordered Bryant off the Rams and sent to Detroit as compensation for the Rams signing free agent wide receiver Ron Jessie. After the judge appeared sympathetic to Bryant's case, the NFL backed off and the Rozelle Rule was subsequently modified.

Later years
He served as running backs coach under Chuck Stobart at the University of Memphis from 1990 through 1993. Bryant died of natural causes on October 13, 2009 at his home in Colorado Springs.

References

External links
 Cullen Bryant (photograph) – The Gazette (Colorado Springs, CO).
 Farmer, Sam. "Cullen Bryant dies at 58; former L.A. Rams running back," Los Angeles Times, Friday, October 16, 2009.

1951 births
2009 deaths
Sportspeople from Lawton, Oklahoma
All-American college football players
American football running backs
Colorado Buffaloes football players
Seattle Seahawks players
Los Angeles Rams players
People from Fort Sill, Oklahoma
National Football League replacement players